Arslan Tash ( "Lion Stone"), ancient Hadātu, is an archaeological site in Aleppo Governorate in northern Syria, around  east of Carchemish and the Euphrates and nearby the town of Kobanî.

History
The city was the center of an Aramean Iron Age kingdom, which was conquered by Assyria in the 9th century BC. The site includes a Late Assyrian palace, an early shrine to Ishtar and a Hellenistic temple, surrounded by city walls and gates adorned with lions carved from stone.

Archaeology

The site of Arslan Tash was first examined in 1836 by an expedition
led by Francis Rawdon Chesney.
The first actual excavations were conducted by the French archaeologist François Thureau-Dangin for the Louvre Museum in two short seasons during 1928. It worked on the fortifications, a Hellenistic period temple, a temple to Ishtar, the "Bâtiment aux ivoires" and late Assyrian remains. 

In 2007 and 2008 work at the site resumed when surveys were conducted by a team from University of Bologna and Directorate-General of Antiquities and Museums of the Syrian Arab Republic. The team was led by Anas al-Khabour and Serena Maria Cecchini. Each season lasted about a week, with the later one including geophysical work.

Gateway reliefs
The Arslan Tash reliefs are bas-reliefs of people and animals on the gates of the city and temple. The dating of the reliefs is uncertain, though one contains an inscription of Tiglath-Pileser III of the Neo-Assyrian Empire

In February 2015, in the Syrian city of Raqqa, the Islamic State of Iraq and the Levant (ISIL) publicly ordered the bulldozing of a colossal ancient Assyrian gateway lion sculpture from the 8th century BC. Another lion statue was also destroyed. Both statues originated from the Arslan Tash archaeological site. The destruction was published in the ISIL magazine, Dabiq.

Ivory items

The most important discoveries from Arslan Tash were, however, the ivory objects of high artistic quality which today are kept at the Archaeological Museum in Aleppo and in the Louvre.

Among them is the Arslan Tash ivory inscription that carries the name 'Hazael'; this was part of a bed that may have belonged to the Biblical king Hazael of Aram-Damascus. The inscription is known as KAI 232.

Amulets
The Arslan Tash amulets are two limestone pieces. They were not excavated, rather purchased from an antiquities dealer, so their actual provenance is uncertain. The writing on the tablets is in Aramaic script, although the language of the inscriptions is Phoenician. The tablets were subject to extensive research over the decades, and they have provided remarkable insights into the society and religion of that period.

Some scholars questioned the authenticity of these amulets. Nevertheless, at this time most scholars believe they're genuine.

Gallery

See also
Cities of the ancient Near East
Destruction of cultural heritage by ISIL
Short chronology timeline
Arslan Tash amulets

Notes

External links 
 Photos of the Arslan Tash ivories in the Louvre.
 Les lions d’Arslan Tash - French website with photos from the Thureau-Dangin campaign.

Archaeological sites in Aleppo Governorate
Iron Age sites in Syria
Former populated places in Syria